Last Mountain Lake,  also known as Long Lake, is a prairie lake formed from glaciation 11,000 years ago. It flows into the Qu'Appelle River via Last Mountain Creek, which flows past Craven. It is the largest naturally occurring body of water in southern Saskatchewan. Only Lake Diefenbaker, which is man-made, is larger. The lake is a popular resort area for residents of south-eastern Saskatchewan.

History 
In the late 1800s, access to the area for farming and settlement was opened up by the Qu'Appelle, Long Lake and Saskatchewan Railroad and Steamboat Company which also operated steamships on the lake.

Until 1974, the lake was known as Long Lake. It  was renamed Last Mountain Lake in honour of a Plains Cree legend about the Great Spirit shovelling dirt from the valley the lake now occupies and forming Last Mountain Hills, east of Duval and Strasbourg.

Last Mountain House 

"Last Mountain House" was a Hudson's Bay Company (HBC) trading post from 1869 to 1871. It was founded in part to compete with the increasing number of independent traders in the area and because the buffalo had moved south from Touchwood Hills. Some time after the second season the post was completely destroyed by fire and was not rebuilt. The area is now part of Last Mountain House Provincial Park and on the Canadian Register of Historic Places.

Geographical features 
Several creeks and rivers flow into the lake, including Arm River, Lewis Creek, and Lanigan Creek. Last Mountain Creek flows out of the lake at the southern most point and into the Qu'Appelle River. During years in which the Qu'Appelle River's level is high, the Last Mountain Creek can reverse direction and flow back into Last Mountain Lake. The gates at Craven Dam on the Qu'Appelle River can be opened or closed for water level control measures. When they're closed, it can backflood water up Last Mountain Creek and into Last Mountain Lake.

Named islands at the northern end of the lake include Royal Island, Bird Island, and Coney Island. 

Near the southern end, on the west side of the lake, is Little Arm Bay, of which the Arm River flows into. Directly across from the bay is Pelican Point. The community of Pelican Pointe is located there.

Last Mountain Lake Sub-basin 
The Qu'Appelle River watershed is divided into two main basins, the Wascana & Upper Qu’Appelle Watersheds and the Lower Qu'Appelle Watershed. Craven Dam at the village of Craven is the dividing point between the upper and lower watersheds of the Qu'Appelle River. The upper watershed is divided into four sub-basins and the Moose Jaw River Watershed, of which Last Mountain Lake Sub-basin is one. The other three sub-basins include Lanigan-Manitou Sub-basin, Wascana Creek Sub-basin, and Upper Qu’Appelle Sub-basin. Last Mountain Lake Sub-basin includes all the land that drains into the lake from the east and west sides of the lake, including Arm River and Lewis Creek. Lanigan Creek at the north end is part of the Lanigan-Manitou Sub-basin and Last Mountain Creek at the south end is part of the Upper Qu’Appelle Sub-basin.

Communities 

Eight different rural municipalities border at least part of the lake. Clock-wise from the north, RMs include Wreford, Last Mountain Valley, McKillop, Longlaketon, Lumsden, Dufferin, Sarnia, and Big Arm.

Resort communities such as Kannata Valley, Arlington Beach, Grandview Beach, Eldora Beach, Regina Beach, Saskatchewan Beach, Buena Vista, Glen Harbour, Alice Beach, Wee Too Beach, Colesdale Park, Spring Bay, Pelican Pointe, Sunset Cove, Island View, Sorensen Beach, Etters Beach, Mohr's Beach, North Colesdale Park, and Sarnia Beach are on the shores of the lake.

Beside Regina Beach, around Little Arm Bay, is Last Mountain Lake 80A Indian reserve.

Parks and recreation 
This park includes a marina, a full-service campground, restaurant, mini-golf, beach, and an outfitters. The beach is along a point and is one of Saskatchewan's longest, natural sand beaches. The marina at the is often used by recreational boaters travelling from Regina Beach as a stop-over or refuelling point and large fishing tournament called Last Mountain Fall Walleye Classic is held there every September. Last Mountain House Provincial Park is located on the south-east shore and provides tours of historical the Last Mountain House, which was built by the Hudson's Bay Company in 1869.

At the northern end of the lake, on the eastern shore is Last Mountain Regional Park. The park offers camping, swimming, and golf.

At the southern end of the lake, where Last Mountain Creek starts, is Valeport Marsh. The area is protected by a 900-acre conservation project called Valeport Wildlife Management Area Trails. It is in conjunction with Ducks Unlimited and part of an Important Bird Area (IBA) of Canada labelled Valeport Marsh (SK 061). Along the west side of the Management Area is a Nature Conservancy of Canada property called Big Valley. Big Valley is protected and managed for bird and wildlife habitat.

The United Church of Canada's Lumsden Beach Camp is "[a] short drive from Regina, ... hugging the south shore of Last Mountain Lake." Founded in 1905, it is the oldest summer camp in Western Canada.

Last Mountain Lake Bird Sanctuary 

The Last Mountain Lake Bird Sanctuary, the first federal bird sanctuary in North America, was established here in 1887. As the first such wildlife reserve of this kind on the continent, it was designated a National Historic Site of Canada in 1987. Over 280 bird species have been recorded. The lake contains appropriate habitat for nine of Canada's 36 species of vulnerable, threatened and endangered birds, such as the peregrine falcon, piping plover, burrowing owl, and whooping crane.

The northern end of the lake is very shallow and contains wetlands. Part of this area of the lake and surrounding area has been set aside as the Last Mountain Lake National Wildlife Area, which is a site of regional importance in the Western Hemisphere Shorebird Reserve Network.

Fish species 
The lake contains a host of fish species including walleye, yellow perch, northern pike, burbot, lake whitefish, cisco, bigmouth buffalo, white sucker, and common carp.

See also 
List of lakes of Saskatchewan
List of protected areas of Saskatchewan
Tourism in Saskatchewan
List of historic places in Saskatchewan
Ramsar site

References 

Elizabeth Browne Losey, Let Them be Remembered: The Story of the Fur Trade Forts, 1999, pages 668-672
Canada's Historic places
Saskatchewan Parks

External links 

Fish Species of Saskatchewan
 Saskatchewan Watershed Authority
Encyclopedia of Saskatchewan
Rowan's Ravine Provincial Park
Last Mountain House Provincial Park
Last Mountain Lake National Wildlife Area

Lakes of Saskatchewan
Ramsar sites in Canada
Hudson's Bay Company trading posts
Important Bird Areas of Saskatchewan